Michael C. Hardy (born March 5, 1972) is an American historian and author of Civil War and western North Carolina books and articles.

Early life and education 
Michael C. Hardy was born in Orlando in 1972 and is a graduate of the University of Alabama's New College Life Track, with honors in Community Studies, focusing on Civil War history.

Career 
Hardy is an independent scholar of the history of the Civil War, North Carolina, and Southern Appalachia. The author of twenty-five books, he was honored as the North Carolina Historian of the Year by the North Carolina Society of Historians in 2010. He received the 2012 Alice Parker Award for Outstanding Literature and Arts from his alma mater, the University of Alabama.
 
Hardy teaches writing and history continuing education classes at Mayland Community College. In 2013, he became a Roads Scholar for the NC Humanities Council, remaining with the program until its demise. His articles have appeared in America's Civil War, Civil War Times, North & South, Gettysburg Magazine, and the Tar Heel Jr. Historians. In 2012, he penned the foreword to New York Times-best-selling author Sharyn McCrumb's re-released novel, Ghost Riders.

A popular speaker, he frequently visits historical sites, museums, and libraries, and he is a member of numerous historical groups. He speaks on local radio and television broadcasts, and, in 2016, he appeared in the American Heroes Channel program Blood and Fury: America's Civil War. He hosts a popular weekly chat program on social media and has published a history blog for nearly twenty years.

Books 
A History Lover's Guide to North Carolina. Charleston, South Carolina: History Press, 2022.
Lee’s Body Guards: the 39th Battalion Virginia Cavalry. Charleston, South Carolina: History Press, 2019.
General Lee’s Immortals : the Battles and Campaigns of the Branch-Lane Brigade in the Army of Northern Virginia, 1861-1865. First edition. El Dorado, California: Savas Beatie, 2018.
The Capitals of the Confederacy: A History. Charleston, SC: The History Press, 2015.
Grandfather Mountain. Charleston, SC: Arcadia, 2014.
Watauga County, North Carolina, in the Civil War. Charleston: The History Press, 2013.
North Carolina Remembers Chancellorsville. Gettysburg: Ten Roads Press, 2013.
Civil War Charlotte: Last Capital of the Confederacy. Charleston, SC: The History Press, 2012.
North Carolina in the Civil War. Charleston, SC: The History Press, 2011.
North Carolina Remembers Gettysburg. Gettysburg, PA: Ten Roads Publishing, 2011.
The Fifty-eighth North Carolina Troops: Tar Heels in the Army of Tennessee. Jefferson, NC:  McFarland and Co., June 2010.
Mitchell County. Charleston, SC: Arcadia Publishing, 2009.
with Robert M. Hardy. "A Heinous Sin": The 1864 Brooksville-Bayport Raid. Raleigh, NC: Lulu, 2009.
with Jimmie Daniels. Families, Friends, and Felons: Growing Up in the Avery County Jail. Raleigh, NC: Lulu, 2008.
Remembering Avery County: Old Tales from North Carolina's Newest County. Charleston, SC: The History Press, 2007.
Caldwell County. Charleston, SC: Arcadia Publishing, October 2006.
Remembering North Carolina's Confederates. Charleston, SC: Arcadia Publishing,September 2006.
The Battles of Hanover Court House and Slash Church. Jefferson, NC: McFarland and Company, June 2006.
A Short History of Old Watauga County, North Carolina. Boone, NC: Parkway Publishing, April 2006.
Avery County, North Carolina. Charleston, SC: Arcadia Publishing, 2005.
The ca.1840 McElroy House: A Glimpse of Yancey County, North Carolina, History. Virginia Beach, VA: Donning Company Publishers, 2004.
The Thirty-seventh North Carolina Troops: Tar Heels in the Army of Northern Virginia. Jefferson, NC: McFarland & Co., 2003.

Articles 
"Burke County-Deep History and Deep Gorges." Carolina Mountain Life. Spring 2016.
"The Race to be Last." Thefederate Veterans. May/June 2015. 	
"Experience History in North Carolina." Greenhouse. March 2015. 
"The Heat of Boone: Historic Buildings on King Street."  Carolina Mountain Life. Spring 2015. 	
"What's in a Name?" Carolina Mountain Life. Fall 2013.
"Looking for Tweetsie." Carolina Mountain Life. Summer 2012.
"Watauga County and the Civil War." High Country Magazine. June/July 2012. 
"Civil War Charlotte" Battlefield Journal. Vol. 15 (Spring 2012). 
"The Great Flood of 1940." Carolina Mountain Life. Spring/Summer 2012. 
"Confederate Monuments at Gettysburg." The Carolina Confederate. September/October 2011.
"'The Ballad of Tom Dooley': A Story in Three Acts." Carolina Mountain Life. Summer 2011.
"The War within the War in the Mountain Region." Tar Heel Junior Historian. Spring 2011.
"Jewels of the Mountains: Inns and Hotels of the High County." Carolina Mountain Life. Spring/Summer 2011.
"'Avery County Slipped Through Like it had been Greased': High Country Counties." Carolina Mountain Life, Winter-Spring 2011.
"A Christmas Tree for the First Lady." Carolina Mountain Life. Winter 2010-11.
"Daniel Boone Slept Here: Looking for the Famed Explorer in the High Country."  Carolina Mountain Life. Autumn 2010.
"On the Trail of Daniel Boone." Carolina Mountain Life. Autumn 2010.
"Rebels, Raiders, and Rogues: The Civil War History of the Blue Ridge Parkway." Carolina Mountain Life. Summer 2010.
"The Legends of Lulu Belle and Skyland Scotty." Carolina Mountain Life. Spring/Summer 2010.
"Irvin McDowell: The Most Unpopular Man in America." America's Civil War. Vol. 22, No. 6 (January 2010).
"That What They Had Done Should Not Be Forgotten." Company Front. Issue 1 (Summer 2008).
"Look Away, Dixie Land." Civil War Times Illustrated. Vol. 20, Number 21 (April 2008).
"McClellan's Missed Opportunity." America's Civil War. Vol. 20, Number 1 (March  2007).
"The Gettysburg Experiences of Col. Collett Leventhorpe, 11th North Carolina Infantry." Gettysburg Magazine. Vol. 36 (January 2007). 
"The Gettysburg Reminiscences of Albert T. Marsh, 53rd North Carolina."Gettysburg Magazine. Vol. 34 (January 2006).
"A Day of Carnage & Blood." America's Civil War, March 2005. 		
"The Gettysburg Experiences of Lt. Iowa Michigan Royster, 37th North Carolina Volunteer Infantry Regiment." Gettysburg Magazine. Volume 29 (July 2003).
"Commands: The 37th North Carolina Troops." America's Civil War. Vol. 16, Issue 2 (May 2003). 
"Union and Confederate Knapsacks and Blanket Rolls." Camp Chase Gazette. Vol. 26,  Issue 9 (August 1999).
"England's Gift to the Confederacy: Brigadier General Collett Leventhorpe." North &  South Magazine, Vol. 1, Issue 6 (1998).

Honors 
2012 - Alice Parker Award for Outstanding Work in Literature and Arts, University of Alabama
2011 - Willie Parker Peace History Book Award, North Carolina Society of Historians, for The Fifty-eighth North Carolina Troops: Tar Heels in the Army of Tennessee.
2010 - North Carolina Historian of the Year, North Carolina Society of Historians
2009 - Jefferson Davis Historical Gold Medal from the United Daughters of the Confederacy for work in preserving Southern history.
2009 - Presented a Superior Achievement Award, Sons of Confederate Veterans.
2009 - Willie Parker Peace History Book Award, North Carolina Society of Historians, for Mitchell County: Images of America (Arcadia Publishing 2009).
2009 - Willie Parker Peace History Book Award, North Carolina Society of Historians, for Families, Friends, and Felons: Growing Up in the Avery County Jail (Lulu, 2008).
2008 - Willie Parker Peace History Book Award, North Carolina Society of Historians, for Remembering Avery County (The History Press, 2007).
2008 - Willie Parker Peace History Book Award from the North Carolina Society of Historians, for Remembering North Carolina's Confederates (Arcadia Publishing, 2007).
2006 - Willie Parker Peace History Book Award from the North Carolina Society of Historians, for A Short History of Watauga County (Parkway Publishing, 2005).
2006 - Willie Parker Peace History Book Award from the North Carolina Society of Historians, for The Battle of Hanover Court House: Turning Point of the Peninsula Campaign (McFarland and Company, 2005).

References

External links 
 Official Website
 Looking for the Confederate War blog

1972 births
Living people
Historians of the American Civil War
University of Alabama alumni
American military historians